Meta-Research Innovation Center at Stanford (METRICS) (co-directors John Ioannidis and Steven N. Goodman)
 Center for Open Science (director Brian Nosek)
 Brazilian Metascience Research Group (BMRG) (director Luis Correia)
 Center for Scientific Integrity
 Meta-Research Center at Tilburg University
 Interdisciplinary Meta-Research Group at The University of Melbourne, Australia
 MiRoR Methods in Research on Research
 Centre for Journalology
 European Network for Knowledge Impact
 The Center for Transforming Biomedical Research of the Berlin Institute of Health
 Evidence-Based Research Network (EBRNetwork)
UCMeta at the University of Canterbury, New Zealand

Metascience